Vasapuram is a village in Yellanur mandal, Anantapur district in the state of Andhra Pradesh in the southern part of India. It comes under Boppepalle.

References

Villages in Anantapur district